Via dei Volsci is a street in Rome located in the Quartiere San Lorenzo. It is to the south and runs parallel to Via Tiburtina. It also links Porta Tiburtina with the Campo Verano cemetery.

Left Wing history
The street has long had a reputation for being a centre for left-wing agitation and organisation. It gave its name to I Volsci the autonomist magazine.

No. 32 Headquarters of the Rome section of Autonomia Operaia in the 1970s. It is currently a social centre.
No. 56 Radio Onda Rossa started broadcasting from here in 1977.

References

Volsci